John Cunningham Knowles , MBE, ED (October 15, 1894 – August 31, 1977) was a political figure in Saskatchewan. He represented Wilkie in the Legislative Assembly of Saskatchewan from 1938 to 1944 as a Liberal.

He was born in Severn Bridge, Ontario, the son of Robert Knowles and Mary Elizabeth Cunningham, and educated in Ufford and at Northern Business College in Owen Sound. Knowles served overseas in France and Flanders during World War I. After the war, he came west and settled on a farm in Unity. Knowles was on the municipal council for Unity and served on the board of directors of the Saskatchewan School Trustees Association and of the Saskatchewan Association of Rural Municipalities. In 1927, he married Inez Viola Mead. He also served in the Canadian Army during World War II. In 1946, Knowles was appointed as a Member of the Order of the British Empire for his military service. After he returned from the Second World War, he managed a real estate company in Regina, retiring in 1965.

References 

Saskatchewan Liberal Party MLAs
1894 births
1977 deaths
Canadian Members of the Order of the British Empire
People from Owen Sound
Canadian military personnel of World War I
Canadian military personnel of World War II